Elmstead Woods railway station is on the South Eastern Main Line, serving the district of Elmstead in the London Borough of Bromley.

It is in Travelcard Zone 4, and the station and all trains are operated by Southeastern.

The station is named after Elmstead Wood.

Services 

The typical off-peak service in trains per hour is:
 2 tph to London Cannon Street (all stations except Lewisham)

On Sundays, the station is served by a half-hourly service between Sevenoaks and London Charing Cross via Lewisham.

Connections
London Buses route 314 serve the station.

References

External links 

Railway stations in the London Borough of Bromley
DfT Category D stations
Former South Eastern Railway (UK) stations
Railway stations in Great Britain opened in 1904
Railway stations served by Southeastern
1904 establishments in England